Garfield Grove is a Giant Sequoia grove near the town of Three Rivers, California. The entire  lies in Sequoia National Park in the Sierra Nevada range in eastern California in the United States.

In December 2001, the neighboring Dillonwood Grove was purchased by the Save The Redwoods League for $10.3 million and added to Sequoia National Park. Prior to the purchase, the Dillonwood Grove was the largest grove in private ownership. The two groves are botanically the same and now managed as a single grove.

Noteworthy trees
Some of the trees found in the grove that are worthy of special note are:
Floyd Otter (tree): This tree was measured in 2001–2002 and found to be the 12th largest tree in the world.
King Arthur (tree): This tree was first discovered in 1949 but only seen from far away, the hiker had told a ranger that he saw a huge tree. In 1978 Wendell Flint, Bob Walker and Gus Boik found the tree and named it King Arthur. This tree is the tenth largest giant sequoia.

See also
 List of giant sequoia groves
 List of largest giant sequoias

References

External links
 Sequoia & Kings Canyon National Parks: Garfield Grove Trail

Giant sequoia groves
Giant Sequoia National Monument
Sequoia National Park
Protected areas of Tulare County, California